F+A Architects is an architectural firm with its main office in Pasadena, California. The firm was formed in 1973, and its work lies primarily in the planning and design of retail stores and shopping malls. Many of the structures the firm has designed are in North America, but it has also worked on large international projects, most notably in Dubai UAE, Qatar, and Jordan.

North American projects
Several of the firm's projects are noted for a simulated Italian village architectural style, a practice that began with the firm's 1998 design of "The Commons" complex in Calabasas, California. The firm would continue using a neo-Italianate motif in its 2005 design of the Simi Valley Town Center regional mall in Simi Valley, California, which is designed to look like an Italian hillside village. To give the Simi Valley Town Center a more European appearance, the mall was designed with architectural elements such as trellised and covered walkways, gardens, courtyards, arches, and copper domes. 

The incorporation of such traditional elements typifies F+A's overall historicist design style. For example, in the 2003 design of the Pike at Rainbow Harbor in Long Beach, California, the firm used numerous shapes, angles, colors, and textures to create a venue that looked like it had always been part of an historical waterfront area. Each building in the complex has a unique footprint, to avoid the uniform "big box store" appearance that is commonplace to many modern shopping malls.

The firm has also designed several malls around the upscale "lifestyle center" design concept, which combines retail shopping with other leisure amenities. For example, The Village at Park Royal Shopping Centre in West Vancouver is considered to be Canada's first lifestyle center.

Middle Eastern projects
The firm's most famous design project to date is the Mall of the Emirates in Dubai, which is considered the world's first "shopping resort". F+A Architects' design of that mall incorporates both European and Arabic design elements.  The firm is currently doing more design work in Dubai, including a motorcycle racetrack, a watersports facility, and a large go-kart racing facility at the Dubailand complex.

Selected work
Ontario Mills (1996), Ontario, California
 The Commons (1998), Calabasas, California
Fashion Fair Mall (renovation and additions, 2003) Fresno, California
Pike at Rainbow Harbor (2003), Long Beach, California
The Village at Park Royal Shopping Centre (2004), West Vancouver, British Columbia, Canada
Mall of the Emirates (2005), Dubai, United Arab Emirates
Simi Valley Town Center (2005), Simi Valley, California
Landmark Theatres building at Westside Pavilion (2007), Los Angeles, California (with PleskowRael)

Awards and recognition
International Design & Development Awards, International Council of Shopping Centers (ICSC) in 2000, 2006, 2007.

Award of Excellence: Commercial/Retail Development, Urban Development Institute-Pacific Region, in 2005.

References

External links
 F+A Architects website

Architecture firms based in California